Sybil Niden Goldrich has been one of the leading consumer advocates involved in the fight for women’s health as it relates to breast implants. Her leadership on this issue began in 1987 when, as a cancer patient having massive difficulties with implants for reconstruction after bi-lateral mastectomy, she uncovered the fact that breast implants had never been approved by the U.S. Food and Drug Administration (FDA). Her article on the subject, “Restoration Drama,” was published in Ms. magazine in June 1988.

She is the co-founder of Command Trust Network, an information clearing house for women to provide facts that were difficult and often impossible to get elsewhere about breast implants and silicone. She has actively worked to educate the press so that correct information about implants and related problems would be disseminated. She has also worked closely with Congressman Ted Weiss (D, NY) who, before his death, chaired the House Subcommittee with oversight of the FDA. Since then, she has testified countless times before various House committees, Senate committees, the FDA, and the California State Legislature. Sybil writes for Beauty and the Breast, a blog she shares with actress Mary Elizabeth McDonough about breast implants.

She continues to monitor silicone issues and advocate for the silicone-afflicted as they move together through the legal system. She is routinely an expert source on the subject for print media and have been featured in stories by all three networks and many cable stations. She is a frequent guest on talk shows and have appeared on Good Morning America, CNN, Nightline, Larry King Live, Oprah, and many others. The New York Times, Wall Street Journal and other papers have published a number of her letters to the editor; her op-ed pieces have appeared in syndicated papers across the country. Over the years, stories profiling her continued activities have appeared in People magazine, USA Today and the LA Times, among others.

She was awarded the California Consumer Activist of the Year and named by Los Angeles magazine as one of the “50 Most Interesting People in Los Angeles.” In 2005, the National Organization for Women honored her as one of their 2005 Woman of Action. Lifetime TV and Hearst Entertainment produced and aired Two Small Voices, a movie of the week about her personal experiences, the Command Trust Network and what was, at that time, the largest class action in the history of the United States.

She was born in New York City and is married to James S. Goldrich, MD, a retired obstetrician- gynecologist. They have two daughters and two grandchildren. She earned a BA from Hofstra College, an MA from New York University, and a Certificate from the Stanford University Publishing Program.

References

Year of birth missing (living people)
Living people
Consumer rights activists
American bloggers
American women bloggers
People from New York City
21st-century American women